

Munster

County Clare

County Cork

County Kerry

County Limerick

County Tipperary

County Waterford

Leinster

County Carlow

County Dublin

County Kildare

County Kilkenny

County Laois

County Longford

County Louth

County Offaly

1920-1922	Offaly Brigade	1st Eastern Division	Barry Byrne

County Westmeath

County Wexford

County Wicklow

Ulster

County Antrim

County Armagh

County Cavan

County Donegal

County Down

County Fermanagh
No.1 Batt. Enniskillen
A. Boho
B. Derrygonnelly 
C. Enniskillen
D. Monea
E. Rosinuremore

No.2 Batt. Belcoo
A. Belcoo
B. Doobally
C. Glan Lower
D. Glan Upper 
E. Killinagh
F. Mullaghdun

County Londonderry

County Monaghan

County Tyrone

Connacht

County Galway

County Leitrim

County Mayo

County Roscommon

County Sligo

Other

Bibliography

References

External links
Bureau of Military History, 1913-1921 at Defence Forces
Order of Battle of the Irish Republican Army, June 1922 by Paul V. Walsh

Irish Republican Army (1919–1922)